Algia is a genus of butterflies of the subfamily Heliconiinae in the family Nymphalidae found in southeast Asia. The genus ranges from Burma to New Guinea.

Species
Listed in alphabetical order:
 Algia fasciata (C. & R. Felder, 1860)
 Algia felderi (Kirsch, 1877)  (New Guinea)
 Algia satyrina (C. & R. Felder, [1867])

References
www.nymphalidae.net

External links

Vagrantini
Nymphalidae genera
Taxa named by Gottlieb August Wilhelm Herrich-Schäffer